Brave 4: Unstoppable (also known as Brave 4) was a mixed martial arts event held live by Brave Combat Federation on Friday March 31, 2017 at the IPIC Arena in Abu Dhabi, United Arab Emirates. The event was broadcast live online and locally through Bahrain TV, ABS-CBN Sports and Action, Combate, Abu Dhabi Sports and OSN Sports.

Background

Brave 4: Unstoppable was Brave Combat Federation's fourth card and the first to be held in the Middle East but outside of Bahrain, where the company headquarters is located. The event was the second international edition of Brave, right after Brave 3: Battle in Brazil.

Brave 4 was headlined by Brave's first ever title fight, between Algeria's Elias Boudegzdame and Mexico's Masio Fullen. Masio was scheduled to be part of Brave's first attempt of a title fight, the canceled bout against Alan Omer at Brave 2: Dynasty, and was kept in the fight. With Omer moving up to the Lightweight division, Elias Boudegzdame filled his spot in the championship fight.

The event also marked the long-awaited debut of Mohammad Fakhreddine under Brave banner, after the Lebanese failed to compete at Brave 1: The Beginning due to an injury. Fakhreddine was set to face Brazil's Vinícius Cruz in the co-main event of the evening.

Abdul Kareem Al-Selwady was supposed to fight Alexandre Rodrigues in a featured Lightweight main card bout. One week before the fight, though, Alexandre was forced to withdraw due to an injury and was replaced by Michael Deiga-Scheck.

Broadcast

The event was broadcast internationally online, through Brave's official website and YouTube channel, for free. In addition, the card was also broadcast in Bahrain through Bahrain TV, Middle East through OSN Sports and Abu Dhabi Sports, Brazil through Combate and Asia through ABS-CBN Sports and Action.

Broadcasting team

Play-by-play commentator: Cyrus Fees
Color Commentator: Alex Soto (former UFC, Titan FC, and Bellator fighter)
Guest Commentator: Cris Cyborg
Cage announcer: Carlos Kremer

Results

Bonus Awards
Fight of the Night: Ottman Azaitar x Charlie Leary
Knockout of the Night: Ottman Azaitar
Submission of the Night: Elias Boudegzdame

References

Mixed martial arts events